Nicolas Michelin (born 25 January 1955) is a French architect and urban planner. After joining forces with Finn Geipel to form LABFAC in 1985, he went on to found ANMA (Agence Nicolas Michelin & Associés) in 2000, which he currently runs in collaboration with his partners Michel Delplace and Cyril Trétout.

Biography 
Born in 1955 in Neuilly-sur-Seine, Nicolas Michelin studied physics and mathematics at Paris VI University before beginning his studies in architecture at the École d’Architecture de Paris-Conflans from where he graduated from in 1980.

In 1985 Nicolas Michelin, along with fellow architect Finn Geipel, founded the architecture firm LABFAC, working between Paris and Berlin. Some of the most notable projects from this collaboration included the École des Beaux Arts in Limoges and the Théâtre de Quimper.

In 2000, he founded ANMA - Agence Nicolas Michelin & Associés (Nicolas Michelin partnered with Michel Delplace and Cyril Trétout), which is involved in architecture, urban design and landscaping.

Nicolas Michelin has written and overseen more than 7 publications. In 2005 he wrote Nouveau Paris, la ville et ses possibles, the catalogue accompanying the eponymous exhibition at the Pavillon de l'Arsenal (17 March to 28 August 2005). With Nicolas Michelin providing the scientific curatorship and Toyo Ito the scenography, the exhibition explored possible future developments in Paris, bearing in mind the requirements of sustainable development and new urban lifestyles.

Between 2006 and 2010, Michelin published five other books: Avis: propos sur l’architecture, la ville, l’environnement (2006), L’Aventure de la transformation d’une halle, des farines à l’université (2007); and Cinq sur cinq – Dix projets sur mesure (2008), which analyses five architectural and urban projects completed by ANMA. In 2008, following AGORA, the biennial architectural fair in Bordeaux, Nicolas Michelin wrote Alerte! Et si on pensait un peu plus à elle?, a manifesto in favour of sustainable architecture and urban design. In 2010, on the occasion of ANMA's 10-year anniversary, his book Attitudes (2010) was published, bringing together his most recent articles over past decade.

Nicolas Michelin has been active in a number of governmental and associative bodies. Michelin has been appointed as an Expert in the following government groups: the Board of 1% Artistique, a reporter for the Délégation aux arts plastiques (French Delegation to the Visual Arts) and the Commission Nationale De La Commande Publique (French National Commission for Public Procurement). Between 1985 and 2000 he directed the École and Centre d’Art Contemporain in Reuil-Malmaison. He also founded the "La Maréchalerie", within the École nationale supérieure d'architecture de Versailles, and was the head director between the years of 2000 and 2009. La Maréchalerie is an arts centre dedicated to research on the role of art in the urban environment. He has been invited to speak at many universities including Columbia University, the University of Montreal and Paris I University. In 2008 he was the general curator for AGORA in Bordeaux (a biennial architecture, urban planning and design exhibition). The exhibition dealt with the intersecting themes of architecture, urban design and sustainable development. At this occasion he also published his most recent book Alerte, et si on pensait un peu plus à elle?. In 2010, in celebration of his firm's 10-year anniversary, he organised a 4-day event to present a selection of the projects designed by ANMA during its first decade. He also used the occasion to host an exhibition featuring debates on ecology, the city and contemporary art. In November 2011, at the Cité Internationale Universitaire de Paris, he chaired the Entretiens du Patrimoine et de l’architecture (Interviews on Heritage and Architecture) discussions, which in 2012 were held on the theme "Heritage and Architecture of Sustainable Cities".

Key projects
 Housing, Îlot Armagnac, media library and gymnasium, 2012, Bordeaux
 L’étang des cygnes residential project, 2012, Meaux
 Social housing, 2012, Alfortville
 ZAC Grand Large housing project, 2010, Dunkirk
 ZAC des Deux Lions housing project, 2010, Tours
 Social housing, 2010, Nancy
 Théâtre Piscine, 2008, Châtenay-Malabry
 Habiter les Quais housing project, 2007, Nantes
 Bureaux de l’Agence de l’eau, 2006, Rouen
 La Halle aux Farines, 2006, Paris

Projects under construction
 New headquarters of the Ministry of Defence, Paris
 ARTEM (Art, Technologie et Management), Nancy
 Caisse d’Allocations Familiales (Family Allowances Fund), Saint Brieuc
 Bibliothèque nationale et universitaire (National University Library), Strasbourg
 Cité Internationale Universitaire de Paris, Paris
 Upcoming Cultural Centre "Les Fuseaux", Saint-Dizier
 Courthouse, Limoges
 Maison de la recherche (Research Institute), Toulon
 The Confluence area in Saint Denis
 The Faubourg d’Arras-Europe area in Lille
 Grand Est, 2010, Dijon
 Les Bassins à Flots, Bordeaux
 Amphitheater District, Metz

Films
 Vers une hybridation des usages. Portrait de Nicolas Michelin is a film directed by Gilles Coudert (13 min / 2006 / a.p.r.e.s production). This film gives the floor to the winner of the Communauté Urbaine du Grand Nancy competition held in May 2005. He discusses the urban design of the ARTEM (Art, Technologie et Management) site in Nancy as well as Nicolas Michelin's urban plans for this city.
 Bordeaux 2046 is a film by Nicolas Michelin released for the Venice Biennial in 2010. Michelin looks at a number of projects underway and offers fictional representations of possible future projects for this city.

Bibliography
 Attitudes, Editions Archibooks, Paris, 2010
 Cinq sur cinq – Dix projets sur mesure, Editions Archibooks, Paris 2008
 Alerte! – Et si on pensait un peu plus à elle? Et si on profitait un peu plus de lui ? Editions Archibooks, Paris, 2008
 L’aventure de la transformation d’une halle – Des farines à l’université, Editions Ante Prima, Paris, 2007
 Avis - Propos sur l’architecture, la ville, l’environnement, Editions Archibooks, Paris, 2006
 Nouveaux paris : la ville et ses possibles / sous la direction de Nicolas Michelin, Editions du Pavillon de l'Arsenal, Paris, 2005
 Finn Geipel, Nicolas Michelin : LABFAC / Laboratory for Architecture; edited by Jac Fol. - Editions du Centre Pompidou, Paris, 1998

References

Sources
 ANMA website
 ENSAV website
 Le Point, 15 September 2011, special Nancy supplement
 Laurence Sanantonios, "Une BNU 'nouvelle'", in Livres Hebdo, No. 706, 19 October 2007, p. 63.
 Prize winner announcement

1955 births
Living people
People from Neuilly-sur-Seine
20th-century French architects
21st-century French architects
French urban planners
Chevaliers of the Légion d'honneur